Walid A. Chammah (born April 12, 1954, Beirut, Lebanon) is the former co-president of Morgan Stanley & Co. and Chairman of Morgan Stanley International. He retired from the Firm in early 2012 after serving Morgan Stanley for over 19 years, including overseeing the Firm's Global Institutional Securities business and operations, and serving as a member of both the Management and Operating Committees.

Prior to joining Morgan Stanley, Mr Chammah was a managing director at The First Boston Corporation and was responsible for U.S. Taxable Fixed Income Capital Markets and the Structured Finance Groups.  Mr Chammah led the asset finance business in the mid-eighties and early nineties and is considered a pioneer in developing the ABS market and all aspects of non-mortgage securitization. Mr Chammah became a partner in 1987.

Mr Chammah sits on the Boards of the American University of Beirut and Bucherer USA; he is an advisory board member of SIGNA Group, and HEC Montreal and a senior policy advisor for I Squared Capital.

He was previously a member of the IMF's Financial Institutions Consultative Group, and is a former board member of the British American Business (BAB) Council, Rosneft Bank and Sovcomflot (2015 - February 2022).

Walid A Chammah is a partner of Chammah and Partners. The firm provides financial advice to institutions and private clients.

Early life and education
A native of Lebanon, Mr Chammah graduated from the American University of Beirut with a Bachelor of Business Administration in 1976 and received a master's degree in International Management from American Graduate School of International Management (now known as the Thunderbird School of Global Management) in 1977.

Career

Mr Chammah joined Morgan Stanley in 1993 as Head of U.S. Debt Capital Markets. In 1996, he was promoted to Worldwide Head of Debt Capital Markets Services. In 2001, Chammah's responsibilities were extended to include Worldwide Leveraged Finance and in 2002, he formed and was Head of the Global Capital Markets Group, which combined the Firm's debt and equity capital markets activities. In 2005, Chammah was named Global Head of Investment Banking and in September 2007 he was named co-president of the firm, a position he held until December 2009.

Mr Chammah started his career at the First Boston Corporation where he was regarded as the pioneer and thought leader in the asset backed securities and non-mortgage securitization sector.  He led the preeminent team on Wall Street in the development and evolution of the securitization of non-mortgage asserts including  automotive loans and leases; credit cards; home equity loans; and collateralized debt obligations.

Personal life
Mr Chammah married Karin Zumtobel on June 12, 1999.  Mr Chammah has four children.

References

American chief executives of financial services companies
American University of Beirut alumni
American people of Lebanese descent
Bankers
American bankers
Living people
Thunderbird School of Global Management alumni
Businesspeople from Greenwich, Connecticut
People from Greenwich, Connecticut
1954 births